Len Phillips (29 March 1891 – 21 March 1978) was an Australian rules footballer who played with Richmond in the Victorian Football League (VFL).

Notes

External links 

1891 births
1978 deaths
Australian rules footballers from Melbourne
Richmond Football Club players
People from Berwick, Victoria